Najla Mohammed El Mangoush (born 7 June 1970) is a Libyan diplomat and lawyer. She has been Libya's Foreign Minister in Abdul Hamid Dbeibeh's government since 15 March 2021. Najla El Mangoush is Libya's first female foreign minister, as well as the fifth woman to hold the position of a foreign minister in the Arab World.

Early life
Mangoush was born in Cardiff, Wales, to a family of four children who originated from Libya, but she grew up in Benghazi, the city to which the family returned, when she was six years old.

Education
Trained as a lawyer at Benghazi University (then Garyounis University) and was later an assistant professor of law at the university. Later on she gained a Fulbright Scholarship to the United States of America, where she graduated from the Center for Justice and Peacebuilding at EMU university in Virginia.

Career 
As a conflict-resolution expert, she was the country representative in Libya for USIP (United States Institute of Peace).

She has served as the Program Officer for Peace-building and Traditional Law at the Center for World Religions, Diplomacy and Conflict Resolution in Arlington, Virginia.

During Libya’s 2011 revolution, she headed the National Transitional Council’s (NTC) Public Engagement Unit which dealt with civil society organisations.

Foreign minister
On 15 March 2021 she became a foreign minister in Abdul Hamid Dbeibeh's cabinet, which is a part of the government of national unity. She is the first female Foreign Minister of Libya and the fifth to hold such a position in the Arab World after Naha Mint Mouknass (2009 - 2011) and Vatma Vall Mint Soueina (2015) of Mauritania, Fawzia Yusuf H. Adam (2012–2014) of Somalia and Asma Mohamed Abdalla (2019–2020) of Sudan.

In May 2021, she came under pressure to resign and been subjected to personal abuse after she called Turkey to comply with the UN resolutions and withdraw the Turkish troops and mercenaries from Libya.

On 6 November 2021, the Presidential Council suspended Mangoush on charges of carrying out foreign policy without coordination with the council. She was also barred from traveling. Prime Minister Abdul Hamid Dbeibeh disputed the right of the Presidential Council to suspend Mangoush, saying the power to appoint or suspend ministers in his government is his exclusive preserve.

Awards
On December 7, 2021, Mangoush was named in the BBC 100 Women 2021 list for her work on building links with civil society organisations.
In 2022, Mangoush received the International Women of Courage Award from the United States Department of State.

See also
List of foreign ministers in 2021
List of current foreign ministers

References 

1973 births
Living people
People from Cardiff
Foreign ministers of Libya
Female foreign ministers
Eastern Mennonite University alumni
George Mason University alumni
Women government ministers of Libya
Libyan lawyers
20th-century Libyan women
21st-century Libyan women
Recipients of the International Women of Courage Award
BBC 100 Women